List of parks and gardens in rural South Australia refers to parks and gardens that located within the rural areas of South Australia as distinguished from those located within the Adelaide metropolitan area.

Adelaide Hills
The following parks and gardens are located within the following local government areas within the South Australian government region known as Adelaide Hills - Adelaide Hills Council and the District Council of Mount Barker.

Adelaide Hills

 Morialta Recreation Area, Stradbroke Road Woodforde
 Mount Lofty Botanic Garden, Lampert Road, Crafers
 Federation Park, Adelaide to Mannum Road Gumeracha
 Stirling Linear Park, Pomona Road Stirling

Mount Barker

 Keith Stevenson Park, Adelaide Road Mount Barker	
 Anembo Park, North Terrace, Littlehampton

Barossa Light and Lower North
The following parks and gardens are located within the following local government areas within the South Australian government region known as the Barossa Light and Lower North - Barossa Council, Town of Gawler, Light Regional Council and Adelaide Plains Council.

Barossa
 Pioneer Park, Murray Street Angaston
Nuriootpa Linear Park, Barossa Valley Highway Nuriootpa
Angas Recreation Park, Washington Street Angaston  
Barossa Bushgardens, Penrice Road Nuriootpa  
Curdnatta Park, Davies Road, Cockatoo Valley  
Moculta Soldiers Memorial Hall & Recreation Park, Keyneton Road Moculta  
Murray Recreation Park, Eden Valley Road, Eden Valley  
Stockwell Recreation Park, Sturt Highway Stockwell  
Talunga Recreation Park, Melrose Street Mount Pleasant  
Tanunda Recreation Park, Tanunda  
Williamstown Queen Victoria Jubilee Park, Williamstown

Gawler
Apex Park Reserve, Julian Whitelaw Terrace Gawler  
Clonlea Park, Murray Road Gawler
Dead Man Pass Reserve
Eldred Riggs Reserve
Elliott Goodger Memorial Park (Willaston Oval)
Pioneer Park
Princes Park
South Gawler Oval
Gawler Oval

Light
Davidson Reserve, Kapunda	
Pengilly Scrub (Mudla Wirra Reserve), Walseys
The Pines Conservation Reserve, north of Kapunda
Dutton Park, Kapunda
Freeling Community Recreation Park, Freeling	
Greenock Centenary Park, Greenock
Wasleys Recreation Park, Wasleys

Adelaide Plains
Aunger Ponds, Lewiston
Bakers Wetlands, Lewiston	
Barabba Reserve, Barabba
Blue Bonnet Reserve, Lower Light
Camel Reserve, Lewiston
Canala Reserve, Two Wells
Cannizzaro Road Reserve, Lewiston
Clydesdale Reserve, Two Wells
Dublin Lions Park, Dublin
Dublin Oval, Dublin
Dublin Parklands, Dublin
Dublin Playground, Dublin
Duck Pond, Mallala
East Reserve, Mallala
Fletcher Reserve, Lewiston
Gameau Reserve, Two Wells
Hams Park, Lewiston
Harniman Reserve, Lewiston
Hart Reserve, Two Wells
Historic Wells, Two Wells
Humzy Reserve, Lewiston
Lewiston Playground, Lewiston
Lewiston Wetlands, Lewiston
Mallala Hub/Arbor, Mallala
Mallala Oval Complex, Mallala
Mallala Playground, Mallala
Parham Foreshore, Parham
Rockies Reserve, Barabba
Thompsons Beach Foreshore, Thompson Beach
Two Wells Dog Park, Two Wells
Two Wells Oval Complex, Two Wells
Two Wells Rose Gardens, Two Wells
Webb Beach Foreshore, Webb Beach

Eyre Western
The following parks and gardens are located within the following local government areas within the South Australian government region known as the Eyre Western - District Council of Ceduna, District Council of Cleve, District Council of Elliston, District Council of Franklin Harbour, District Council of Kimba, District Council of Lower Eyre Peninsula, City of Port Lincoln, District Council of Streaky Bay, District Council of Tumby Bay, City of Whyalla and Wudinna District Council.

Ceduna
Apex Park, Ceduna  
Big 4 Ceduna Tourist Park, Ceduna	
Ceduna Foreshore Park Lands, Ceduna
Far West Aboriginal Sporting Complex, Ceduna

Cleve
Redbanks, Arno Bay  
Wharminda Soaks, Wharminda	
Jetty Reserve, Turnbull Park Arno Bay
Lions Centenary Park, Rudall Road Arno Bay
Yeldulknie Reservoir, Cleve

Elliston

Franklin Harbour

Kimba
Lions/Apex park, Kimba  
Memorial Garden, High Street Kimba

Lower Eyre Peninsula
Coffin Bay Foreshore, Coffin Bay  
Cummins Railway Triangle (Park), Bruce Terrace Cummins

Port Lincoln

Streaky Bay
Doctors Beach, Streaky Bay  
Eyre Avenue Lawns, Streaky Bay	
Lions Park, Streaky Bay
Poochera Oval Precinct, Poochera
Poochera Town Centre, Poochera
Sceale Bay Foreshore Park, Sceale Bay
Streaky Bay Foreshore Lawns, Streaky Bay
Streaky Bay Oval Precinct, Streaky Bay
Streaky Bay Skate Park, Streaky Bay
Wirrulla Oval Precinct, Wirrulla
Wirrulla Town Centre, Wirrulla

Tumby Bay
Anear Park, Port Neill  
Flinders Park, Tumby Bay	
Foreshore Playground, Tumby Bay
Heritage Park, Port Neill
Island Lookout, Tumby Bay
Island Playground, Tumby Bay
Koppio Old School Playground, Koppio
Lions Park, Tumby Bay
Lipson Oval, Lipson
Moody Tanks Railway Reserve, Ungarra
Mortlock Park, Tumby Bay
Port Neill Foreshore, Port Neill
Port Neill Oval, Port Neill
Port Neill Tennis Courts, Port Neill
Ramsey Bicentennial Gardens, Port Neill
Tod River Reservoir
Travellers Rest, Tumby Bay
Tumby Bay Oval, Tumby Bay
Ungarra Memorial Park, Ungarra
Ungarra Oval, Ungarra
Yallunda Flat Showgrounds, Tumby Bay

Whyalla

 Ada Ryan Gardens, Watson Terrace Whyalla
 Civic Park, Nicolson Avenue Whyalla Norrie

Wudinna
Mount Wudinna, Wudinna  
Pildappa Rock, Minnipa	
Polkdinney Park, Eyre Highway Kyancutta
Polda Rock, Wudinna
Standley Park, Medley Terrace Wudinna
Tcharkulda Hill, Minnipa
Wudinna Apex Recreation Park, Wudinna
Wudinna Sports Grounds, Wudinna

Far North
The following parks and gardens are located within the following local government areas within the South Australian government region known as the Far North - District Council of Coober Pedy, Flinders Ranges Council, the City of Port Augusta and the Municipal Council of Roxby Downs.

Coober Pedy

Flinders Ranges
Lions Park, Quorn  
Powell Gardens, Quorn	
Quorn Tennis and Netball Courts, Quorn
Quorn Town Oval, Quorn
Thompson Memorial Playground, Quorn
Blue Burt Park and Playground, Hawker  
Hawker Community Sporting Centre and Playground, Hawker

Port Augusta
Gladstone Square, Port Augusta  
Eastside Foreshore, Port Augusta	
Apex Park, Port Augusta
Volunteer Park, Port Augusta
Keith Jones Memorial Park, Port Augusta
Lions Jubilee Park, Port Augusta
Central Oval, Port Augusta
Arboretum Park, Port Augusta
Back Beach, Port Augusta
 Australian Arid Lands Botanic Garden, Port Augusta West
Westside Foreshore, London Road Port Augusta
Water Tower Lookout, Port Augusta West
Rotary Park, Shirley Street Port Augusta West
Northey Crescent, Port Augusta West
Sid Welk Park, Port Augusta West
Robert 'Bert' McKenzie Memorial Parkland, Stirling North

Roxby Downs
 Roxby Downs Cultural and Leisure Precinct, Richardson Place Roxby Downs

Fleurieu and Kangaroo Island
The following parks and gardens are located within the following local government areas within the South Australian government region known as the Fleurieu and Kangaroo Island - Alexandrina Council, Kangaroo Island Council, the City of Victor Harbor and the District Council of Yankalilla.

Alexandrina
 Commodore Reserve, Basham Parade Port Elliot
 Memorial Park, Coleman Terrace Strathalbyn
Port Elliot Half-Pipe (Skate Park) Port Elliot
Middleton Half Pipe (Skate Park) Middleton
Goolwa Skate Park & BMX Track Goolwa
Strathalbyn Skate Park, Strathalbyn
Goolwa Oval, Hutchinson Street Goolwa
Port Elliot Oval, Oval North Terrace Port Elliot
Strathalbyn Oval, Coronation Road Strathalbyn
Langhorne Creek Oval, Murray Road Langhorne Creek
Ashbourne Oval, Bull Creek Road Ashbourne
Mount Compass Community Centre Oval, Burgess Drive Mount Compass
Mount Compass Burgess Oval, Peters Terrace Mount Compass
Milang Oval, Milang Road Milang
Finniss Oval, Hamley Terrace Finniss

Kangaroo Island
American River Foreshore, American River  
Baudin Beach Foreshore, Baudin Beach
Christmas Cove, Penneshaw	
Emu Bay Foreshore, Emu Bay	
Frenchmans Rock, Penneshaw	
Hanson Bay Foreshore,	
Independence Point, American River	
Lions Park, Parndana	
Lloyd Collins Reserve, Penneshaw	
Memorial Park, Kingscote	
North Terrace Gardens, Penneshaw	
Pennington Bay	
Pioneer Park, Parndana	
Prospect Hill	
Reeves Point, Kingscote	
Remembrance Reserve, American River	
Snelling Beach Foreshore (garden), Middle River	
Stokes Bay (park), Stokes Bay	
Tidal Pool, Kingscote	
Wright Park, Kingscote

Victor Harbor

 Soldiers Memorial Park - Esplanade, Victor Harbor

Yankalilla
Apex Park, Normanville  
Banksia Park, Normanville	
Broadbeach Drive Reserve, Carrickalinga
Bungala Park, Normanville
Edwards Avenue, Normanville
Haycocks Point, Carrickalinga
Ingalalla Waterfalls, Hay Flat  
Jetty Caravan Park, Normanville
Katherine Drive Reserve, Normanville
Manisty Drive Reserve, Yankalilla
Memorial Park, Yankalilla
Mitchell Reserve, Carrickalinga
Myponga Beach Reserve, Myponga Beach
Myponga Picnic Reserve, Myponga
Myponga Reservoir Lookout, Myponga
Normanville Foreshore, Normanville
Normanville Rise Reserve, Normanville
Old War Memorial, Yankalilla
Rapid Bay Camping Ground, Rapid Bay
Robert Norman Park, Normanville
Second Valley Playground, Second Valley
Second Valley Soldiers Memorial Reserve, Second Valley
Tuna Crescent Reserve, Carrickalinga
War Memorial Reserve, Yankalilla
Yankalilla Lions Youth Park, Yankalilla

Limestone Coast
The following parks and gardens are located within the following local government areas within the South Australian government region known as the Limestone Coast - District Council of Grant, Kingston District Council, The City of Mount Gambier, Naracoorte Lucindale Council, District Council of Robe, Tatiara District Council and Wattle Range Council.

Grant
Blackfellows Caves, Hammer Parade, Blackfellows Caves
Carpenter Rocks, Carpenter Rocks Road, Carpenter Rocks
Donovans (upper), Lot 68 Adams Street Donovans
Donovans (lower), Donovans Landing Access Donovans
Kongorong, 1 Hay Terrace Kongorong
 Little Blue Lake,  Mount Salt Road, Mount Schank
Mount Schank, Post Office Road, Mount Schank
Nene Valley, 5 Neville Avenue Nene Valley
Port MacDonnell (Football Club), Elizabeth Street Port MacDonnell
Lions Park, Sea Parade Port MacDonnell
Little Hunter, East of Jetty, Sea Parade Port MacDonnell
Periwinkles, West of Jetty, Sea Parade Port MacDonnell
Woolwash, Sea Parade, Port MacDonnell
Tarpeena, Edward Street Tarpeena
Yahl, Yahl Hall Road Yahl

Kingston
Apex Park, Kingston SE
Burt Baseley Memorial Park, Kingston SE	
Family Tree Park, Kingston SE
Kingston Soldiers Memorial Park, Kingston SE
Lions Park, Kingston SE
Old School Oval, Kingston SE
Wirrilder Park, Kingston SE

Mount Gambier

 Valley Lake - Haig Drive, Mount Gambier

Naracoorte Lucindale

 Naracoorte Nature Park - Naracoorte Creek, Naracoorte

Robe
Playground, Longbeach (near caravan park) Robe
Playground, foreshore (opposite the post office) Robe
Playground, Robe Street Robe

Tatiara
Tolmer Park, Bordertown	
Bordertown Swimming Pool, Bordertown	
Apex Park, Bordertown	
Virgo Park, Bordertown	
Bowman Park, Bordertown 
Soldiers Park, Bordertown
Wildlife Park, Bordertown
Recreation Lake, Bordertown	
Memorial Park, Bordertown
Mundulla Oval, Mundulla 
Moot Yang Gunya Swamp, Mundulla 
Community Centre, Wolseley 
Western Flat Recreation Reserve, Western Flat 
Hartley Randell Park, Keith 
Don Moseley Park, Keith 
Pilmore Park, Keith 
Soldier's Park, Keith 
Lions Park, Keith 
"Cow Patch", Keith 
Apex Park, Padthaway	
Settlers Memorial Park, Padthaway	
Pioneers Memorial Park, Padthaway	
Recreation Reserve, Willalooka

Wattle Range
Beachport Cricket Oval, Millicent Road Beachport
Centennial Park, Somerville Street, Beachport	
Nigel Philip Harvey Playground, corner of George and Giles Streets, Southend
Southend Community Centre, Eliza Street, Southend
Southern Ocean Caravan Park, Railway Terrace, Beachport
Susan Wilson Playground, Railway Terrace, Beachport
Coonawarra Park, Memorial Drive Coonawarra
Kalangadoo Institute, George Street Kalangadoo
Kalangadoo Lions Park, Eliza Street Kalangadoo
Kalangadoo Railway Park, Railway Terrace, Kalangadoo
Kalangadoo War Memorial Oval, Kalangadoo
Bolton Oval, Mount Gambier Road Millicent
Brennan Park, Brennan Street Millicent	
Civic and Arts Centre Reserve, George Street Millicent
Commercial Park, Commercial Street Millicent
Corcoran Park, Railway Terrace West Millicent
Domain Playground Park, Ridge Terrace Millicent
George Street Reserve, George Street Millicent
Jubilee Park, North Terrace Millicent
Hains Park, East Terrace Tantanoola
Hatherleigh Sport & Recreation Centre, North East Terrace Hatherleigh
Hart Park, Hart Street Millicent
Kealy Park, English Drive Millicent
Kelae Glade Park, Kirip Road Glencoe
McArthur Park, McArthur Street Millicent
McLaughlin Park, Williams Road Millicent
Millicent Swimming Lake, Park Terrace Millicent
Monash Park, Monash Terrace Millicent
Centennial Park, George Street Millicent
Mount Burr Football Oval, Riddoch Avenue Mount Burr
Nitschke Park, Nitschke Street Millicent
Norm Facey Oval, McLaughlin Park, Williams Road Millicent
Rotary Club Centenary Park, Battye Street Millicent
Rendelsham Cricket Club, Rendelsham
Tantanoola Football Club, South Terrace Tantanoola
Tantanoola Park, North Terrace Tantanoola
Greenrise Lake Reserve, Riddoch Highway Penola
Lions Park, Shanks Street Penola	
McCorquindale Park, Cameron Street Penola
Mother Mary Mackillop Memorial Park, Bowden Street Penola
Penola War Memorial Park, Church Street Penola

Murray Mallee
The following parks and gardens are located within the following local government areas within the South Australian government region known as the Murray Mallee - Berri Barmera Council, District Council of Karoonda East Murray, District Council of Loxton Waikerie, Mid Murray Council, Rural City of Murray Bridge, Renmark Paringa Council, Southern Mallee District Council and Coorong District Council.

Berri Barmera
Alan Glassey Park, Berri  
Berri Lookout Gardens, Berri
Berri Marina Park, Berri
Berri No.1 Oval, Berri
Berri No 2. Oval, Berri
Berri Riverfront, Berri
Berri Swim Pool Park, Berri
Bruce Oval, Barmera
Cobdogla Oval, Cobdogla
Cobdogla Park, Cobdogla
Colin Jennings Apex Park, Barmera
Curnow Park, Berri
Fletcher Park, Barmera
Johnny Bains Park, Barmera
Lake Vista Park, Barmera
Martins Bend, Berri
Mathews Park and Playground, Berri
Memorial Oval, Barmera
Monash Adventure Park, Monash
Monash Oval, Monash
Morris Street Park, Loveday
North Lake, Barmera
Payne Reserve, Barmera
Pepper Tree Hill reserve, Berri
Pioneer Park, Berri
Pioneer Park Hall of Fame, Berri
Pump Station Park, Berri
Rotary Park, Berri
Rowe Reserve, Berri
Sanford Park, Berri
Sargent Park, Barmera
Sedunary Park (Playspace), Barmera

Karoonda East Murray
Karoonda Caravan & Cabin Park, Karoonda  
Karoonda Recreation Reserve, Karoonda	
Railway Terrace Lawns, Karoonda

Loxton Waikerie
Alawoona Playground, Alawoona  	
Anzac Crescent Playground, Loxton
Apex Park, Waikerie
Civic Centre Grounds, Waikerie
Harry Tickle Memorial Swimming Pool, Loxton
Heppner Park, Waikerie
Hilbig Street Playground, Loxton
Ifould Park, Waikerie
John Jennings Park, Waikerie
Kaesler Street Playground, Loxton
Kingston Cemetery, Kingston-On-Murray
Kingston Riverfront, Kingston-On-Murray
Lions Riverfront Playground, Waikerie
Loxton Apex Park, Loxton
Loxton Aquatic Club, Loxton
Loxton Cemetery, Loxton
Loxton Horse and Pony Club, Loxton
Loxton Lions Park, Loxton
Loxton North Recreation Grounds, Loxton
Loxton Riverfront, Loxton
Loxton Show and Recreations Grounds, Loxton
Moorook Cemetery, Moorook
Moorook Oval, Moorook
Moorook Riverfront, Moorook
Paisley Riverfront, Paisley
Paruna Oval, Paruna
Pioneer Gardens, Waikerie
Promnitz Gardens, Waikerie
Ramco Apex Park, Ramco
Ramco Cemetery, Ramco
Ramco Community Recreation Grounds, Ramco
Sturt Street Playground, Loxton
Waikerie Apex Park, Waikerie
Waikerie Cemetery, Waikerie
Waikerie Cemetery, Waikerie
Waikerie Hockey & Cricket Oval, Waikerie
Waikerie Lions Park, Waikerie
Waikerie Memorial Gardens, Waikerie
Waikerie Oval, Waikerie
Waikerie Pony Club, Waikerie
Waikerie Recreation Centre, Waikerie
Waikerie Riverfront, Waikerie
Waikerie Swimming Pool, Waikerie
Wunkar Oval, Wunkar

Mid Murray
Bolto Reserve, Mannum  
W.A.B. Reserve, Bowhill
Cambrai Park Reserve Cambrai
Five Mile Riverfront Reserve, Mannum
Graeme Claxton Reserve, Cadell
Haythorpe, Mannum
John Christian Reserve, Cambrai
Len Batten Reserve, Walker Flat
Arnold Park Reserve, Mannum
Mary-Ann Reserve, Mannum
Mannum Waterfalls Reserve, Mannum
Purnong Ferry Landing, Purnong
Schwertfegers Swamp Reserve, Sedan
Seven Mile Riverfront, Mannum
Shell Hill Reserve, near Black Hill
Tom Groggin Reserve, Younghusband
Towitta Park, Towitta
TP Bellchambers Reserve, Milendella
Younghusband Reserve, Younghusband
Zadows Landing Reserve, Wall Flat

Murray Bridge

Sturt Reserve - Jaensch Road, Murray Bridge

Renmark Paringa

Southern Mallee
Pinnaroo Animal Park, Pinnaroo  
Pinnaroo Lions Playground, Pinnaroo	
Pinnaroo Showground and Oval, Pinnaroo
Pinnaroo Wetlands, Pinnaroo
Women's Agricultural Bureau Memorial Garden, Pinnaroo

Coorong
Coomandook Park, Coomandook  
Coonalpyn Oval, Coonalpyn 
Coonalpyn Playground, Coonalpyn
Coonalpyn Soldiers Memorial Park, Coonalpyn
Ki Ki Park, Ki Ki
Meningie Lions Jubilee Park, Meningie
Meningie Oval, Meningie
Narrung Narrows Park, Narrung
Pangarinda Arboretum, Wellington
Peake Oval, Peake
Peake Pollys Well, Peake
Point Malcolm Lighthouse, Narrung
Rogers Park, Tailem Ben
Tailem Bend BMX Track, Tailem Bend
Tailem Bend Freds Landing, Tailem Bend
Tailem Bend Highway Park, Tailem Bend
Tailem Bend Playground, Tailem Bend
Tailem Bend Riverfront Reserve, Tailem Bend
Tailem Bend RSL War Memorial Park, Tailem Bend
Tintinara Apex Park, Tintinara
Tintinara Oval, Tintinara

Yorke Mid North
The following parks and gardens are located within the following local government areas within the South Australian government region known as the Yorke Mid North - District Council of Barunga West, District Council of Clare and Gilbert Valleys, District Council of the Copper Coast, Regional Council of Goyder, District Council of Mount Remarkable, Northern Areas Council, District Council of Orroroo Carrieton, District Council of Peterborough, Port Pirie Regional Council, Wakefield Regional Council and Yorke Peninsula Council.

Barunga West
Bute Wildlife Sanctuary, Railway Terrace Bute
Port Broughton Foreshore, West Terrace, Port Broughton	
Port Broughton Skate Park, Port Broughton
Port Broughton Sports and Oval Complex, Port Broughton

Clare and Gilbert Valleys
Auburn Recreation Grounds, Auburn
Clare Oval, Clare
Manoora Recreation Grounds, Manoora
Mintaro Oval, Mintaro
Riverton Oval, Riverton
Saddleworth Recreation Grounds, Saddleworth
Tarlee Recreation Grounds, Tarlee
Watervale Recreation Grounds, Watervale
Centenary Park, King Street Auburn
Auburn Oval, Ford Street Auburn
Catford Park, Caravan Park Main North Road Clare
Sanders Park, Lennon Street Clare
Maynard Park, Pioneer Avenue Clare
Melrose Park (Inchiquin Lake), White Hut Road Clare
Lions Park, Victoria Road Clare
Neagles Rock Reserve, Neagles Rock Road Clare
Hentschke Park, Essington Avenue Clare
Centenary Park Oval, Weymouth Street, Manoora
Torr Park, Burra Street Mintaro, Mintaro
Rhynie Park, Main North Road Rhynie
Gilbert Lake, Marrabel Road Riverton
Riverton Recreation Ground, Barrier Highway Riverton
Winkler Park, Barrier Highway Saddleworth
Showgrounds, Marrabel Road Saddleworth
Stockport Oval, Murray Street Stockport
Tarlee Oval, Main North Road Tarlee
Watervale Oval, Main North Road Watervale

Copper Coast
Victoria Square, Graves Street Kadina
Hockey Oval, Corner Port Road and Drain Road Kadina	
Newtown Playground, Corner David Street and Lawrence Street Kadina
Apex Park, Rendell Street Kadina
Kadina Sports Area, Doswell Terrace Kadina
Verran Terrace (reserve), Verran Terrace Moonta
Queen Square, George street Moonta
Polgreen Park, Moonta Bay Road Moonta
Car Park Area, Moonta Bay
Moontana Avenue (reserve), Moonta Bay
Clayton Drive (reserve), Clayton Drive North Beach	
Oceanview Drive (park), Oceanview Drive North Beach		
 North Beach Township Coastal Garden, North Beach
Dowling Drive, Port Hughes
South Beach, Port Hughes	
Simms Cove, Port Hughes
Patricks View, Port Hughes
Wallaroo Adventure Playground, Irwin Street Wallaroo
Sincock Square Reserve, Victoria Street Wallaroo
Davies Square, Wallaroo
Wildman Street (park), Wallaroo
John Terrace (park), Wallaroo
Centenary Park, Wallaroo
Owen Terrace (park), Wallaroo
Bews Square Wallaroo
Jetty Road Wallaroo
Emu Street Wallaroo
Errington Street (park), Errington Street Wallaroo
Heritage Drive Boat Ramp Wallaroo
Heritage Drive (park), Heritage Drive Wallaroo
Stately Way Wallaroo Marina Wallaroo
Abraham Rydeberg Drive (park), Abraham Rydberg Drive Wallaroo

Goyder
Booborowie Recreation Ground
Bower Recreation Reserve	
Burra Gorge
Burra Sports Complex
Duncan Park, Farrell Flat
Eudunda Centenary Gardens
Eudunda Oval
Hallett Playground
McCulloch Park, Whyte Yarcowie
Pioneer Park, Terowie
Point Pass Standpipe Reserve
Robertstown Oval
Robertstown Playground
Sir Hubert Wilkins Reserve, Mount Bryan
Thomas Pickett Reserve

Mount Remarkable

 Port Germein, Esplanade, Port Germein

Northern Areas
Belalie Creek, Jamestown
Caltowie Playground, Caltowie	
Centenary Park, Spalding
Couzner Park, Jamestown
Georgetown Playground, Georgetown
Jacka Creek Walking Trail, Jamestown
Main Street Park, Gladstone
Memorial Park, Jamestown
North Laura Parklands, Laura
Robinson Park, Jamestown
Skatepark, Jamestown
Tresylva Park, Gladstone

Orroroo Carrieton

Peterborough
Victoria Park, Queen Street Peterborough
Rotary Park, Main Street Peterborough
West Park, between Princess and Wright Streets Peterborough
Off-Leash Dog Park, Telford Ave Peterborough
Skate Park, Main Street Peterborough

Port Pirie
Bowman Park, Crystal Brook	 -
Crystal Brook Playground, Crystal Brook	
Skate Park, Crystal Brook
Smelters Picnic Grounds, Crystal Brook
Bunyip Park, Koolunga
White Cliffs Park, Koolunga
Lawrie Park, Napperby
Napperby Playground, Napperby
4Shore Sk8 Skate Park, Port Pirie
Arthur Crescent Park, Port Pirie
Beach Reserve, Port Pirie
Catherine Commons Park, Port Pirie
Flinders View Park, Port Pirie
Frank Green Park, Port Pirie
Globe Oval, Port Pirie
Higgins Court, Port Pirie
Jubilee Park, Port Pirie
Memorial Oval, Port Pirie
Memorial Park, Port Pirie
Pasminco Park, Port Pirie
Plenty Park Port Pirie
Princess Park, Port Pirie
Senate Road Sporting Complex, Port Pirie
Stanhope Park, Port Pirie
Threadgold Park, Port Pirie
Woodward Park, Port Pirie
Solomontown Beach, Beach Road, Solomontown
Warnertown Park, Warnertown

Wakefield

Yorke Peninsula

See also
List of Adelaide parks and gardens
Protected areas of South Australia

References

 
 
Parks
South Australia